Gaia Gozzi, known as Gaia (born 29 September 1997), is an Italian singer, songwriter, and dancer.

She became famous for winning the nineteenth edition of the talent show Amici di Maria De Filippi in 2020, and for being the runner-up at the tenth edition of the Italian version of X Factor in 2016.

Biography and career 

Gaia was born in Guastalla (Reggio Emilia), from a Brazilian mother and an Italian father; she currently lives in Viadana (Mantua). In her songs she mixes Italian and Brazilian Portuguese.

In 2016 she participated as a contestant in the tenth edition of the TV format X Factor, becoming part of Fedez's team, finishing in second place. She released her EP New Dawns, containing the same-titled single, certified gold by FIMI for selling over 25,000 copies. During 2017 she opened the concerts of Giorgia's Oronero Tour and released the single "Fotogramas".

In 2019 she was cast in the nineteenth edition of the talent show Amici di Maria De Filippi. The singer wrote and composed several songs during the program, included in the album Genesi, released on March 20, 2020, by Sony Music. The album debuted at number 15 in the FIMI chart, peaking the fifth position following the talent show singer's victory. The promotional single "Chega", reached number 11 in the Italian Singles charts. On April 22, she announced the reissue of the album in physical format, entitled Nuova Genesi.

She competed at the Sanremo Music Festival 2021 with the song "Cuore amaro", which was placed 19th in the grand final and was lately certified gold in Italy. On 14 May 2021 was published the collaboration in Portuguese "Boca" with Sean Paul, later certified golden disc by FIMI. On 1 October 2021 released "Nuvole di zanzare", a single that anticipates the second studio album Alma, out on 29 October. The album, which featured Francesca Michielin, Gemitaiz, Tedua, peaked at number 18 on Italian Albums Chart. In November 2021, Gaia was among the artists featured at Corona Capital Festival in Mexico City, performing alongside Tame Impala, Disclosure and The Kooks.

In  2021 Gaia collaborated with emerging singer Madame on "Luna" and with Italian rapper Rkomi on "Mare che non sei", respectively peaking at  35 and 30 on the Italian Singles Chart, earning the golden certification by FIMI. In 2022, she released "Salina", her third single from Alma, and collaborated with Carl Brave on Sick Luke's song "Mosaici".

Discography

Studio albums

Extended plays

Singles

Other appearances

Television

References

External links
 

Italian pop singers
Living people
21st-century Italian singers
1997 births
21st-century Italian women singers
Italian singer-songwriters
People from Guastalla
Italian people of Brazilian descent
People of Lombard descent